WMWX (88.9 FM) – branded as ClassX Radio – is a non-commercial classic rock radio station licensed to Miamitown, Ohio.  WMWX is owned by Spryex Communications. The WMWX studios are located in the Cincinnati suburb of Blue Ash, Ohio, while the station transmitter resides in Brookville, Indiana and offices in Liberty Township, Ohio.

WMWX primarily serves western parts of Greater Cincinnati, but also extends its signal by using one full-power repeater.  Licensed to Waynesville, Ohio, repeater WYNS (89.1 FM) provides coverage to Warren County, Ohio.

On April 19, 2019, WMWX and its repeater stations dropped the "ClassX" classic rock format and began stunting and launched a Christian classic hits format two days later, branded as "Touch FM".   and on November 1, 2019, dropped TouchFM and returned ClassX Radio's format.

History
WMWX signed on the air with 5,000 watts on August 6, 2006. WMWX aired an Album Rock format. In 2011, WMWX expanded its broadcasting signal to simulcasting on 89.1 FM (WKCX) in Cincinnati as well as 89.1 FM (WYNS) in Waynesville, Ohio.

Current "ClassX" programming
WMWX has an all-volunteer staff with live on-air disc jockeys. The station airs a variety of classic rock, including heavy metal, psychedelic rock, blues, progressive rock, garage rock, and hair metal, as well as specialty shows featuring The Beatles (Beatles-a-Rama), Pink Floyd (Floydian Slip), and Reelin' In The Years (a locally produced program that features a weekly theme).

Other notes
The call sign WMWX was previously used for Philadelphia's Mix 95.7 station, now broadcasting as WBEN-FM.

Current Logo

References

External links
ClassX Radio website

MWX
Radio stations established in 1999
1999 establishments in Ohio
Classic rock radio stations in the United States